The 2013–14 season was Football Club Internazionale Milano's 105th in existence and 98th consecutive season in the top flight of Italian football. The team competed in Serie A and the Coppa Italia, finishing fifth in the league and qualifying for the 2014–15 UEFA Europa League.

Season overview
On 24 May 2013, five days after the conclusion of the season, head coach Andrea Stramaccioni was fired and replaced by Walter Mazzarri. The June begun with Inter announcing the new one-year contract renewals of veterans Javier Zanetti and Walter Samuel. Players such as Tommaso Rocchi and Walter Gargano left the club after their respective contract expired. Antonio Cassano was sold at Parma for an undisclosed fee, while Giulio Donati and Luca Caldirola were sold in Germany respectively to Bayer Leverkusen and Werder Bremen. On 2 July, Inter and Deutsche Bank sign a partnership agreement, with Deutsche Bank becoming the club's new top sponsor.

The club was very active during the summer transfer window, notably acquiring the signings of Hugo Campagnaro, Ishak Belfodil, Mauro Icardi and Marco Andreolli, with the latter returning after six years. Dejan Stanković left the club after nine years by terminating his contract a year early by mutual consent, while youngsters Marco Benassi and Francesco Bardi signed contract extensions with the club, keeping them at Inter until 30 June 2017; they also went on loan at Livorno for the upcoming season. Backup goalkeeper Juan Pablo Carrizo also signed a new two-year contract.

Without European football as a distraction, Inter finished the season in fifth place qualifying for the Europa League: on September 22, Inter achieved its largest away win in Serie A beating Sassuolo 7–0. Inter managed to break some records, such as most goals scored in away games (35) and goals scored by defenders (16): in opposition, it had collected the most home draws (9) and fewest penalty kicks. In November 2013, Indonesian businessman Erick Thohir was elected as new Inter president, replacing Massimo Moratti, who remained as honorary president.

This season was the last for Javier Zanetti (who made his debut in 1995, becoming captain in 1999), Esteban Cambiasso (who had played for Inter since 2004), Walter Samuel (signed in 2005), Cristian Chivu (signed in 2007) and Diego Milito (who arrived in 2009, just prior to Inter's treble-winning 2009–10 season).

Players

Squad information

Pre-season and friendlies

Pinzolo training camp

International Champions Cup

Other friendlies

Competitions

Overview

Serie A

League table

Results summary

Results by round

Matches

Coppa Italia

Statistics

Appearances and goals
As of 18 May 2014

|-
! colspan=10 style=background:#dcdcdc; text-align:center| Goalkeepers

|-
! colspan=10 style=background:#dcdcdc; text-align:center| Defenders

|-
! colspan=10 style=background:#dcdcdc; text-align:center| Midfielders

|-
! colspan=10 style=background:#dcdcdc; text-align:center| Forwards

|-
! colspan=10 style=background:#dcdcdc; text-align:center| Players transferred out during the season

|}

Squad statistics
{|class="wikitable" style="text-align: center;"
|-
!
! style="width:70px;"|League
! style="width:70px;"|Cup
! style="width:70px;"|Total Stats
|-
|align=left|Games played       || 38 || 3 || 41
|-
|align=left|Games won          || 15 || 2 || 17
|-
|align=left|Games drawn        || 15 || 0 || 15
|-
|align=left|Games lost         || 8  || 1 || 9
|-
|align=left|Goals scored       || 62 || 7 || 69
|-
|align=left|Goals conceded     || 39 || 3 || 42
|-
|align=left|Goal difference    || 23 || 4 || 27
|-
|align=left|Clean sheets       || 15 || 1 || 16
|-
|align=left|Goal by Substitute || 5 || 0 || 5
|-
|align=left|Total shots        || – || –|| –
|-
|align=left|Shots on target    || – || –|| –
|-
|align=left|Corners            || – || –|| –
|-
|align=left|Players used       || 28 || 27 || –
|-
|align=left|Offsides           || – || – || –
|-
|align=left|Fouls suffered     || – || – || –
|-
|align=left|Fouls committed    || – || – || –
|-
|align=left|Yellow cards       || 72 || 4 || 76
|-
|align=left|Red cards          || 3 || – || 3
|-

Players Used: Internazionale has used a total of – different players in all competitions.

Goalscorers

Last updated: 31 May 2014

Clean sheets
The list is sorted by shirt number when total appearances are equal.

References

Inter Milan seasons
Internazionale Milano